Sint-Leocollege was a Catholic high school and elementary school in Bruges, Belgium. Sint-Leocollege was established in 1890 as a private boys' school. In 1916, it was transformed into a public school and in 1993, girls were first allowed to take classes.

References

Catholic schools in Belgium
Education in Bruges
1890 establishments in Belgium
Educational institutions established in 1890